Christopher John Holmes (born June 23, 1958) is an American heavy metal guitarist and songwriter. Holmes started his musical career in the Pasadena, California area in the late 1970s and early 1980s. He is best known as the lead guitarist of heavy metal band W.A.S.P. Together with Blackie Lawless and Randy Piper he was one of the founding members of the band. Holmes was a member of W.A.S.P. first from 1983 to 1990, and again from 1996 to 2001.

Career

W.A.S.P.
Prior to  meeting Blackie Lawless and Randy Piper, and joining W.A.S.P., Holmes played guitar with Los Angeles bands Buster Savage, LAX, and Slave. Holmes joined W.A.S.P. from 1983 to 1990, playing on the first four studio albums and the first live album. In 1996, Holmes rejoined W.A.S.P., and remained lead guitarist until 2001. Holmes has not played with W.A.S.P. since.

Randy Piper’s Animal
Holmes was contacted by friend and former bandmate Randy Piper to join Piper's new project, Animal. Holmes quickly relocated to Ohio to prepare for Animal's upcoming "900 lb Steam" tour. The tour was considered successful, and after its conclusion, Animal recorded tracks for a new album.

After Animal
After Holmes returned to Los Angeles in late 2003, he began working with several Southern California-based metal groups, producing and contributing guitar tracks. In 2005, Holmes contributed with the song "Anything but Down" for the soundtrack of Hot Wheels: AcceleRacers. In 2007, Holmes was involved in the filming of a Randy Rhoads documentary directed by Peter M. Margolis, which is yet to be released. Holmes appears briefly in a 2009 episode of VH1's Rock Docs, "Do It For The Band: The Women of Sunset Strip." In the Summer of 2009 Holmes released Secret Society's "Death by Misadventure."

Where Angels Suffer and solo career

In 2010, he joined Where Angels Suffer with Randy Piper on guitar, Steve Unger (Metal Church) on bass, Rich Lewis (Animal), on vocals, and Stet Howland on drums (Blackfoot, Lita Ford, Killing Machine, Belladonna, Impellitteri, Sister and W.A.S.P.). Ira Black has since replaced Piper. The band toured Europe for the first time in 2011.

On November 26, 2012, Chris Holmes released his first solo album Nothing to Lose and decided to produce, manage and distribute it himself along with his wife Catherine Holmes. After his first album, Chris started recording his second solo album, Shitting Bricks. On May 2, 2015, that album was released worldwide and on the same day Chris Holmes played his first concert in Nantes, France, with his new band Mean Man . Two of the songs were filmed live, and uploaded to the official YouTube channel. 

In September 2018, Chris recorded the EP "Under the Influence" at Replug studio, mixed by Raphael Gary and produced by Chris and Catherine Holmes. It was released on the 2nd December 2018 in Dublin.

Since 2019 Chris has introduced new members to Mean Man: guitarist Oliver Tindall, bassist Lex Gifford and Stephen Jackson, drums. In early 2022 he was diagnosed with throat and neck cancer, future plans had to be set on hold because of the necessary treatment.

The Metal Years interview
While a member of W.A.S.P., Holmes participated in the filming of the documentary film, The Decline of Western Civilization Part II: The Metal Years, directed by Penelope Spheeris. The film included interviews with many well-known heavy metal personalities of the era discussing their lifestyle and the metal scene in late 1980s Los Angeles.

Holmes' contribution to the 1988 documentary is perhaps the most memorable, because he was interviewed while floating in a swimming pool, fully clothed and visibly quite intoxicated while his mother sat poolside. The interview stood out in stark contrast to the more light-hearted and humorous interviews conducted by director Penelope Spheeris, which mostly portrayed rockers as good-natured (though often dimwitted or deluded) party animals.  During the interview, Holmes smiles drunkenly at the camera, deems himself "a full-blown alcoholic" and "a piece of crap" despite his band's success, and punctuates his remarks by guzzling from three bottles of vodka. At the end of the interview, Holmes opens a full bottle of Smirnoff over his head as he rolls out of his inflatable chair and into the water (Spheeris has stated that the bottle was actually half filled with vodka, with the rest being pool water). Holmes looked back on the interview with a 
"sequel pool interview" in 2017, with his wife asking him the same questions; Holmes stated that he has been sober since February 6, 1996.

Mean Man documentary
Chris Holmes is the subject of the 2020 documentary Mean Man: The Story of Chris Holmes , directed by Antoine De Montremy and Laurent Hart.  The project's title is from the song "Mean Man" on the 1989 W.A.S.P. album The Headless Children.

Personal life
Chris Holmes has been married three times. His first marriage was to Kaylen Rodgers in the late 1980s. He was briefly married to Lita Ford in the early 1990s. He is now married to Catherine Holmes, whom he wed in August 2012.

In 2014, Chris Holmes and Catherine Holmes moved to Finland, but after living in Porvoo for a few months they moved to France where Catherine's parents lived. The couple currently resides in Cannes, France.

Guitars
 Jackson Custom Rhoads (Black with brass hardware). Used in the movie The Dungeonmaster. Returned after Chris was offered an endorsement from Jackson/Charvel.
 Jackson/Charvel Custom parts Star (Yellow, completely beaten-up).
 Jackson Custom Star (White with red blood splatter).
 Jackson Custom Rhoads (Black with white bevels, "I'm A Animal" painted in white on the back of the neck).
 Jackson Custom Rhoads (White pearl with black bevels, with "Fuck Off N Die" painted in red on the back of the neck. This guitar was later sent back to Jackson's custom shop after the wing broke to get the wing cut shorter, as well as the slimmer neck and zebra/lion graphic added). Sold on eBay, currently residing in Finland.
 Jackson Custom Star (Black with Harley Davidson graphic and yellow bevels). Sold on eBay.
 Fender Stratocaster (Red with white pickguard). seen once on a TV Show.
 Jackson Custom Star (Budweiser graphic and reverse Strathead-neck). Smashed by Lita Ford.
 Jackson Flying V (Natural).
 Jackson Custom Kelly (previously with Headless Children graphic, with "Touch Me And Die" painted in yellow on the back of the neck, now black and white with California Highway Patrol decal which Chris claims to have stolen from the door of a police car).
 Gibson Flying V (Black with white pickguard).
 Ibanez Destroyer (Black).
 Amfisound Custom (Pavement graphic).
 Ibanez Destroyer (Red). In an interview, Holmes said that this guitar was borrowed by Eddie Van Halen for the recording of the Women and Children First album. The guitar can be seen in the Neil Zlozower "Women and Children First" Sunset Sound studio photographs. Eddie had a similar Ibanez Destroyer that he modified after recording Van Halen into the Shark Destroyer. Eddie did not like the tone after the modification so he borrowed Chris Holmes's Ibanez Destroyer. Holmes' Red Ibanez Destroyer is distinctive because it was modified to have only a single volume control whereas usually there are two volume controls and one tone control. The Red Ibanez Destroyer is now in the possession of The Tone Zone's Doug Anderson as part of his collection of Van Halen memorabilia often referred to as "The Van Halen Museum".

References

External links
Chris Holmes - Uber Rock Interview 2013
Chris Holmes - Uber Rock Interview 2014
Chris Holmes - 'Nothing To Lose' - Uber Rock Album Review 

American heavy metal guitarists
Musicians from Pasadena, California
L.A. Guns members
W.A.S.P. members
Living people
1958 births
People from La Cañada Flintridge, California
Guitarists from California
American male guitarists
20th-century American guitarists
20th-century American male musicians